Stonecrest is a historic home located at Rhinebeck, Dutchess County, New York.  It was built about 1905, and is a two-story, stone and frame Shingle Style asymmetrical building.  It features a gambrel roof pierced by variety of irregularly placed gables and dormers and a wraparound verandah.  Also on the property is a contributing carriage house.

It was added to the National Register of Historic Places in 1987.

References

Houses on the National Register of Historic Places in New York (state)
Shingle Style architecture in New York (state)
Houses completed in 1905
Houses in Rhinebeck, New York
National Register of Historic Places in Dutchess County, New York
1905 establishments in New York (state)